Lagunillas Municipality is one of the 21 municipalities that make up Zulia State, Venezuela. There are about 170,000 inhabitants. The shire town is Ciudad Ojeda.

See also 
Municipalities of Venezuela

External links 
 http://www.randytrahan.com/ocov/

Municipalities of Zulia